Herbert Reginald Howden (called Reginald) was a Canadian Anglican priest in the 20th century.

Howden was educated at the University of Toronto. Ordained in 1937,  his first post was a curacy at St Clement, Toronto. He held incumbencies at Lakefield, Barrie and Thornhill. He was Archdeacon of Scarborough from 1974 to 1976.

References

University of Toronto alumni
Archdeacons of Scarborough, ON
20th-century Canadian Anglican priests